Chad Thomas (born October 12, 1995), also known as Major Nine, is a former American football defensive end and rapper. He played college football at Miami (FL) and was drafted by the Browns in the third round of the 2018 NFL Draft.

High school career
Thomas led Booker T. Washington High School to the Class 4A state title as junior in 2012 and class 4A state champs as senior in 2013. He recorded 57 tackles and six sacks in 2012. He was named 2013 second-team All-USA by USA Today and tallied 71 tackles and eight sacks as senior. After high school, Thomas chose Miami over Alabama, Florida State, Arkansas and Duke.

College career
Thomas started every game as a senior, recording 41 tackles, 12.5 for a loss (leading the team) and 5.5 sacks.

Professional career
On December 27, 2017, it was announced that Thomas had accepted his invitation to play in the 2018 East-West Shrine Game. He had a productive week of practice and separated himself as the top defensive end prospect playing in the East-West Shrine Game. On January 20, 2017, Thomas made one tackle as part of the East who lost 14–10 to the West in the 2018 East-West Shrine Game. His overall performance during the week garnered him an invitation to the 2018 Senior Bowl. Thomas also impressed scouts and team representatives during practices for the Senior Bowl, but was unable to play in the game due to an unspecified injury. Thomas attended the NFL Scouting Combine in Indianapolis and completed the majority of drills, but opted to skip the bench press, short shuttle, and three-cone drill.

On March 28, 2018, Thomas participated at Miami's pro day and performed the 40-yard dash (4.78s), 20-yard dash (2.81s), 10-yard dash (1.74s), vertical jump (32.5"), broad jump (9'10"), short shuttle (4.83s), and three-cone drill (7.36s). At the conclusion of the pre-draft process, Thomas' draft projections varied from as early as the third or fourth rounds to as late as the sixth or seventh rounds by NFL draft experts and scouts. He was ranked as the 14th best defensive end in the draft by Scouts Inc. and was ranked the 19th best defensive end by DraftScout.com.

The Cleveland Browns selected Thomas in the third round (67th overall) of the 2018 NFL Draft. Thomas was the sixth defensive end drafted in 2018.

On May 21, 2018, the Cleveland Browns signed Thomas to a four-year, $4.08 million contract that includes a signing bonus of $1.04 million.

Thomas was waived by the Browns on September 5, 2020.

Music career
Thomas is also a music producer and rapper, known as Major Nine. Thomas has worked with Rick Ross, Raphael Saadiq, and has produced his own music. In 2020, he appeared on Chris Brown and Young Thug's mixtape Slime & B, on the track "Trap Back". He released his album, "Soul Ties", on December 25, 2018, which led to a huge increase in his fanbase.

References

External links
Miami Hurricanes bio

1995 births
Living people
American football defensive ends
Cleveland Browns players
Miami Hurricanes football players
Players of American football from Miami
Rappers from Miami
Booker T. Washington Senior High School (Miami, Florida) alumni